Mount Laing is a mountain on Vancouver Island, British Columbia, Canada, located  east of Gold River and  northeast of Mount Filberg.

See also
 List of mountains of Canada

References

Vancouver Island Ranges
One-thousanders of British Columbia
Nootka Land District